The Lion King II: Simba's Pride (also titled as The Lion King 2: Simba's Pride) is a 1998 American animated direct-to-video musical romantic drama film. It is the sequel to Disney's 1994 animated feature film, The Lion King, with its plot influenced by William Shakespeare's Romeo and Juliet, and the second installment in The Lion King trilogy. According to director Darrell Rooney, the final draft gradually became a variation of Romeo and Juliet.

Produced by Walt Disney Video Premiere and animated by Walt Disney Animation Australia, the film centers on Simba and Nala's daughter Kiara, who falls in love with Kovu, a male rogue lion from a banished pride that was once loyal to Simba's evil uncle, Scar. Separated by Simba's prejudice against the banished pride and a vindictive plot planned by Kovu's mother Zira, Kiara and Kovu struggle to unite their estranged prides and be together.

Most of the original cast returned to their roles from the first film with a few exceptions. Rowan Atkinson, who voiced Zazu in the first film, was replaced by Edward Hibbert for both this film and The Lion King 1½ (2004). Jeremy Irons, who voiced Scar in the first film, was replaced by Jim Cummings, who briefly provided his singing voice in the first film. Despite initially receiving mixed to negative reviews, the film experienced a positive reassessment in later years, with many critics deeming it as one of Disney's better direct-to-video sequels.

Plot 

In the Pride Lands of Africa, King Simba and Queen Nala's daughter, Kiara, becomes annoyed with her father's overprotective parenting. Simba assigns his childhood friends meerkat Timon and warthog Pumbaa to follow her. After entering the forbidden "Outlands", Kiara meets a young cub, Kovu, and they are attacked by crocodiles. They escape using teamwork and Kiara even saves Kovu at one point. When Kovu retaliates to Kiara's playing, Simba confronts the young cub just as he is confronted by Zira, Kovu's mother and the Outsiders' leader. Zira reminds Simba of how he exiled her and the other Outsiders, and she says Kovu was to succeed Simba's deceased uncle and nemesis Scar.

After returning to the Pride Lands, Nala and the rest of the pride head back to Pride Rock while Simba lectures Kiara about the danger posed by the Outsiders. He then tells her that they are a part of each other. In the Outlands, Zira reminds Kovu that Simba killed Scar and exiled everyone who respected him. Kovu explains he does not think it is bad to befriend Kiara, and Zira realizes she can use Kovu's friendship with Kiara to exact revenge on Simba.

Several years later, Kiara, now a young adult, begins her first solo hunt. Simba has Timon and Pumbaa follow her in secret, causing her to hunt away from the Pride Lands. As part of Zira's plan, Kovu's siblings Nuka and Vitani trap Kiara in a fire, allowing Kovu to rescue her. In exchange for the rescue, Kovu asks to join Simba's pride. Simba is forced to accept Kovu's place since he rescued Kiara. Later that night, Simba has a nightmare about attempting to save his father, Mufasa, from falling into the wildebeest stampede but is stopped by Scar who then morphs into Kovu and sends Simba to his death.

Kovu contemplates attacking Simba, but he is interrupted by Kiara and starts spending more time with her. Kovu becomes conflicted between his mission and his feelings for Kiara until Rafiki, a mandrill who serves as shaman and advisor, leads them to the jungle, where he introduces them to "upendi" (an erroneous form of upendo, which means "love" in Swahili), helping the two lions fall in love. That night, Simba allows Kovu to sleep inside Pride Rock with the rest of the pride at Nala's persuasion. Upon learning of Kovu's failure to kill Simba, Zira sets a trap for them.

The next day, Kovu once again attempts to explain his mission to Kiara, but Simba takes him around the Pride Lands and tells him Scar's story. The Outsiders attack Simba, resulting in Nuka's death and Simba's escape. In the aftermath, Zira scratches Kovu, causing him to turn on her. Returning to Pride Rock, Kovu pleads Simba for forgiveness but is exiled due to Simba thinking he was behind the ambush. Upset, Kiara makes Simba realize he is acting irrationally, and flees to find Kovu. The two lions later find each other and profess their love. Realizing that they must reunite the two prides, Kiara and Kovu return to the Pride Lands and convince them to stop fighting. Zira, however, refuses to let go of the past, and attempts to kill Simba, but Kiara intervenes and Zira falls to her death.

With his enemy gone, Simba apologizes to Kovu for his mistake, and the Outsiders are welcomed back into the Pride Lands.

Voice cast 

 Matthew Broderick as Simba, son of Mufasa and Sarabi, King of the Pride Lands, Nala's mate, and Kiara's father. Cam Clarke provided his singing voice.
 Neve Campbell as Kiara, daughter of Simba and Nala, heir to the Pride Lands, Kovu's love interest and later mate. Liz Callaway provided older Kiara's singing voice.
 Michelle Horn voiced young Kiara, while Charity Sanoy provided her singing voice and Ashley Edner provided her lion growls.
 Jason Marsden as Kovu, Zira's son, Nuka and Vitani's younger brother, and Kiara's love interest and later mate. Gene Miller provided Kovu's singing voice.
 Ryan O'Donohue provided the voice of young Kovu.
 Suzanne Pleshette as Zira, the leader of the Outsiders, Scar's most loyal follower, and the mother of Nuka, Vitani, and Kovu.
 Moira Kelly as Nala, Queen of the Pride Lands, Simba's mate, daughter-in-law of Mufasa and Sarabi, and Kiara's mother.
 Nathan Lane as Timon, a wisecracking and self-absorbed yet somewhat loyal meerkat who is Pumbaa and Simba's best friend.
 Ernie Sabella as Pumbaa, a naïve warthog who is Timon's and Simba's best friend.
 Robert Guillaume as Rafiki, an old mandrill who serves as the shaman of The Pride Lands.
 Edward Hibbert as Zazu, a red-billed hornbill who serves as the king's majordomo.
 Andy Dick as Nuka, Zira's son, Vitani and Kovu's older brother and the oldest male of Zira's family.
 Meredith Scott Lynn as Vitani, Zira's daughter and Nuka and Kovu's sister.
 Lacey Chabert voiced young Vitani while Crysta Macalush provided her singing voice.
 James Earl Jones as Mufasa, Simba's late father, Kiara's grandfather, Nala's father-in-law and the previous King of the Pride Lands.
 Jim Cummings as Scar, Mufasa's younger brother, Simba's uncle, Kiara's great-uncle, and Kovu's mentor who appears in a brief cameo.

Production 
In May 1994, discussion had begun about the possibility of a direct-to-video sequel to The Lion King before the first film had been released in theaters. In January 1995, it was reported that a Lion King sequel was to be released "in the next twelve months". However, it was delayed, and then it was reported in May 1996 that it would be released in early 1997. By 1996, Darrell Rooney had signed on to direct the film while Jeannine Roussel would serve as producer.

In April 1996, Jane Leeves of Frasier fame had been cast as Binti, who was to be Zazu's girlfriend, but the character was ultimately dropped. In August 1996, Cheech Marin reported that he would reprise his role as Banzai the hyena from the first film, but the character was ultimately cut from the sequel. In December 1996, Matthew Broderick was confirmed to be returning as Simba while his wife, Sarah Jessica Parker, and Jennifer Aniston were in talks to voice Aisha, Simba's daughter. Andy Dick was also confirmed to have signed on to voice Nunka, the young villain-in-training-turned hero, who attempts to romance Aisha. Ultimately, the character was renamed Kiara (after it was discovered that Aisha was the name of a female Power Ranger), and voiced by Neve Campbell, from the Scream film series. Nunka was renamed Kovu, and voiced by Jason Marsden. Then-Disney CEO Michael Eisner urged for Kovu's relationship to Scar to be changed during production as being Scar's son would make him Kiara's first cousin once-removed.

According to Rooney, the final draft gradually became a variation of Romeo and Juliet. "It's the biggest love story we have," he explained. "The difference is that you understand the position of the parents in this film in a way you never did in the Shakespeare play." Because none of the original animators were involved in the production, the majority of the animation was done by Walt Disney Television Animation's studio in Sydney, Australia. However, all storyboarding and pre-production work was done at the Feature Animation studio in Burbank, California. The additional animation was by Disney's Canadian animation studio and Toon City in Manila, Philippines. By March 1998, Disney confirmed the sequel would be released on October 27, 1998.

Release 
Coincided with its direct-to-video release, Simba's Pride was accompanied with a promotional campaign, which included tie-ins with McDonald's, Mattel, and Lever 2000. Unlike the North American release, Simba's Pride was theatrically released in European and Latin American countries in spring 1999.

The film was first released on VHS in the United States and Canada on October 27, 1998, and on DVD as a limited issue on November 23, 1999. The DVD release featured the film in a letterboxed 1.66:1 aspect ratio, the trailer for the movie, and a music video of "Love Will Find a Way" performed by Heather Headley and Kenny Lattimore. In 1998, Disney believed that The Lion King II: Simba's Pride would be so popular that it shipped 13 million copies to stores for the October 27 release date. In March 2001, it was reported that in its first three days, 3.5 million VHS copies were sold, and ultimately about thirteen million copies were sold. In September 2001, it was reported that Simba's Pride had sold more than 15 million copies. Overall, consumer spending on The Lion King II: Simba's Pride accumulated about $300 million — roughly the same figure of its predecessor's theatrical release at that time. By 2005, it still remained as one of the top-selling direct-to-video releases of all time, with $464.5 million worldwide in sales and rentals.

On August 31, 2004, the film was re-released on VHS and a 2-Disc Special Edition DVD. The DVD edition featured optional pop-up informational commentary, several interactive games (including Timon And Pumbaa’s Virtual Safari 2.0), five humorous "Find Out Why" shorts, an animated short based on Lebo M's "One by One", and a "Proud of Simba's Pride" featurette. The Special Edition version featured changes made to the film such as Kovu in the water being re-animated as well as other alterations. A DVD boxed set of the three The Lion King films (in two-disc Special Edition formats) was released on December 6, 2004. In January 2005, the film, along with the sequels, went back into moratorium.

On October 4, 2011, Simba's Pride was included in an eight-disc box set trilogy set with the other two films. The Blu-ray edition for the film was released as a separate version on March 6, 2012. The Blu-ray edition has three different versions, a 2-disc Blu-ray/DVD combo pack, a 1-disc edition, and a digital download. The Blu-ray edition has also been attached with a new Timon & Pumbaa short, in which the two friends gaze at the night sky as the star constellations resemble their favorite meal, insects.

The film was re-released by Walt Disney Studios Home Entertainment on a Blu-ray combo pack and digital release along with The Lion King 1½ on August 29, 2017 — the same day as the first film's Signature Edition was released.

Reception 
The review aggregation website Rotten Tomatoes reports that the film has an approval rating of 62% based on 13 reviews with an average rating of 6/10.

Siskel & Ebert gave the film a "two-thumbs up" and said it was a "satisfactory sequel to one of the most popular films of all time, The Lion King". However, they also said it was best that it went to video, citing that the music was lacking and not remotely equal to the original's soundtrack. TV Guide gave the film  stars out of four, claiming that, despite being of slightly higher quality than Disney's previous direct-to-video animated sequels, "comes nowhere near the level of its big-screen predecessor", either musically or artistically. The review later states: "Though most of the original characters and their voices are back, they all sound bored, apart from the zesty addition of Suzanne Pleshette as the scheming Zira. The overall result is OK for kids, who will enjoy the low humor provided by the comical meerkat Timon and the flatulent warthog Pumbaa, but it could have been so much better."

Writing for Variety, Joe Leydon commented in his review: "In marked contrast to most of the studio's small screen sequels to bigscreen animated hits, the new pic isn't merely kids' stuff. Not unlike its predecessor, Lion King II has enough across-the-board appeal to entertain viewers of all ages." Caryn James of The New York Times concluded her review: "It's the rare sequel that matches the creative flair of an original, of course. The Lion King II may be derivative, but it is also winning on its own." The parental website Screen It rated the movie 7 out of 10, claiming "...while it doesn't have the mighty roar of its predecessor, The Lion King II: Simba's Pride is clearly one of the better straight to video releases ever to come out of Hollywood. Although the animation isn't quite up to par with the original, the new songs don't have that special touch that made them and The Lion King such a success, and the fact that the film suffers somewhat from a heavy dose of familiarity, this is still a pretty decent picture."

Entertainment Weekly critic Stephen Witty, who graded the sequel a C+, wrote, "Despite its drawbacks, The Lion King II could make a decent rental for undemanding under-7 fans of the original, who won't be overburdened by the psychodrama. For true believers who've already watched and rewound their copies to shreds, it might even make a good buy. And for them, hey, hakuna matata. But for the rest of us, caveat emptor might be a better motto." James Plath of Movie Metropolis gave the film 6/10, saying that, "Simply put, we've seen it all before." Felix Vasquez Jr. of Cinema Crazed derided, "the sequel is as predictable a sequel as can be. It takes from The Fox and the Hound with shades of Romeo and Juliet and side steps the interesting Simba in favor of his bland daughter Kiara, and Timon and Pumba [sic]."

Music

Songs

Soundtrack 
An audio CD entitled Walt Disney Records Presents: Return to Pride Rock: Songs Inspired by Disney's The Lion King II: Simba's Pride was released on September 8, 1998. Although not promoted as a soundtrack to the film, it contained all the songs from the film and some additional songs inspired by it by Lebo M.

Related television series and sequel 
In January 2016, a television series titled The Lion Guard began airing on Disney Junior, following a television pilot film The Lion Guard: Return of the Roar in November 2015. The majority of the series takes place during the years in-between Kiara's first meeting with Kovu as a cub and her first hunt as a young adult. It focuses on Kiara's younger brother Kion who as second-born, becomes leader of The Lion Guard, a group who protect the Pride Lands and defend the Circle of Life.

Kovu, Vitani, Nuka, and Zira appear in the season 1 episode "Lions of the Outlands". Additionally, Kovu and Vitani make an appearance in the season 3 episode and series finale "Return to the Pride Lands", which takes place after the events of Simba's Pride. Jason Marsden, Lacey Chabert and Andy Dick all reprised their roles from the film, while Suzanne Pleshette (who died in 2008) was replaced by Nika Futterman.

At the end of the season 3 premiere, "Battle for the Pride Lands", the Lion Guard leave the Pride Lands and go to the Far East in search of the Tree of Life for help, after Kion and another guard member are injured while defeating Scar's spirit. This explains Kion's absence from Simba's Pride.

References

External links 

 
 
 
 
 

The Lion King (franchise)
1998 films
1998 animated films
1998 direct-to-video films
1990s adventure films
1990s American animated films
Animated films about revenge
1998 children's films
1998 musical films
1998 romantic drama films
American adventure comedy films
American children's animated adventure films
American children's animated drama films
American children's animated musical films
American coming-of-age films
Animated adaptations of William Shakespeare
Animated drama films
American romantic drama films
American sequel films
Animated coming-of-age films
Animated films about lions
Animated romance films
Annie Award winners
Direct-to-video drama films
Direct-to-video sequel films
Disney direct-to-video animated films
DisneyToon Studios animated films
Drama animation
Films scored by Nick Glennie-Smith
Films about royalty
Films about prejudice
Films based on Romeo and Juliet
Films based on works by William Shakespeare
Films directed by Darrell Rooney
Films set in Africa
Zulu-language films
Films set in Uganda
Swahili-language films
Disney Television Animation films
Australian animated feature films
Australian sequel films
1990s English-language films
Films about father–daughter relationships